The Brink may refer to:

The Brink (2017 film), a Hong Kong action film
The Brink (2019 film), a documentary film
The Brink (The Jezabels album), a 2013 album by The Jezabels
The Brink (TV series), an American comedy television series
The Brink, a 2011 album by Alternative 4
The Brink, a research news publication from Boston University

See also

 
Brink (disambiguation)
On the Brink (disambiguation)